Snorri Thorfinnsson (Old Norse and Icelandic: Snorri Þorfinnsson or Snorri Karlsefnisson) probably born between 1004 and 1013, and died c. 1090) was the son of explorers Þorfinnur Karlsefni and Guðríður Þorbjarnardóttir. He is considered to be the first child of European descent to be born in the Americas, apart from Greenland. He became an important figure in the Christianisation of Iceland.

Name
Snorri is an Old Norse name derived from the word snerra, meaning "a fight." Þorfinnsson is a patronymic, meaning "son of Þorfinnr", (see Icelandic naming conventions). Snorri was named for his great-grandfather, Snorri Þórðarson, or after Snorri Þorbrandsson who was not a kinsman but a participant in Karlsefni's expedition

Family 
There is speculation about the birth date of Snorri Thorfinnsson.  Birth years such as 1005, 1009, and 1012 have been postulated, but all sources agree that he was born between 1004 and 1013. According to the Vinland sagas, when Snorri was 3 years old, his family left Vinland because of hostilities with indigenous peoples (called Skrælingar by the settlers, meaning "barbarians").  The family returned to the Glaumbær farm in Seyluhreppur.

Snorri Thorfinnsson had two children; a daughter named Hallfrid, and a son named Thorgeir. Hallfrid was the mother of Thorlak Runolfsson, bishop of Skálholt in the south of Iceland. One of the descendants of Snorri's brother Thorbjorn, Bjorn Gilsson, was also a bishop of Hólar. Thorgeir was the father of Yngvild who was the mother of Brand Sæmundarsson, bishop of Hólar. The sculptor Bertel Thorvaldsen claimed descent from Snorri Thorfinnsson in the 19th century.

Christianisation of Iceland
In the 13th century texts Snorri Thorfinnsson and Snorri Thorrgrimsson are considered the two main figures responsible for the early Christianisation of Iceland. Consequently, they were portrayed by various writers of the 13th and 14th century as "Christian chieftain models". According to Grœnlendinga saga, Snorri had built the first church of Glaumbaer, which would later increase Christian influence in the area. His descendants became the first Bishops of Iceland, and published the first Christian Code of Iceland.

Legacy
Snorri Thorfinnsson was purported to be born in Vinland (North America), making him the first European child known to be born in the Americas, provided that Greenland is defined as being outside the Americas. 
In 2002, American archaeologists discovered the remains of a thousand-year-old longhouse located on Iceland's northern coast. It is believed that it was Snorri Thorfinnsson's farmhouse. The longhouse was found near the Glaumbær Folk Museum, at the Skagafjörður Heritage Museum outside the coastal village of Sauðárkrókur. The museum was once thought to have been built on the site of Snorri's farmhouse. According to archaeologists it was "a classic Germanic fortress longhouse like the Great Hall of Beowulf".

There is a non-profit organisation called The Snorri Program that focuses on the history of Icelandic settlers in North America and regularly runs exchange programs for youth and adults.

Genealogy

Below is the genealogy of descendants of Snorri, as given in the close of each saga, Grœnlendinga saga ch. 9 and  Eiríks saga ch. 14. It is supplemented with further ancestral information from (Eiríks saga ch. 7 and Landnámabók), a more complete family tree for which, see Thorfinn Karlsefni.

Family tree
The following stemma is drawn from the genealogy appended to the last chapter of Eiríks saga rauða in Hauk's own recension (in the Hauksbók, supplemented with additional information from the Landnámabók).

{{Tree chart | |GRANDPA|y|VALGERD|GRANDPA=Olaf(?){{Refn|Erlend's patronymic given as "Erlendr Ólafsson sterki" in the Index to Diplomatarium islandicum, Vol. II, p. 951}}|VALGERD=Valgerd Flosadottir
|boxstyle_GRANDPA=border:none
}}

Footnotes

References
Texts
. For Eiríks saga rauða'' A=Hauksbók, B=AM 557=Skálholtsbók.

Translations

 

Studies

External links
Biography at the Dictionary of Canadian Biography Online
Snorri Thorfinnsson
Guðríðr Eiríksdóttir

11th-century births
11th-century deaths
Viking Age in Canada
11th-century Icelandic people
11th-century North American people
Year of death unknown
History of Christianity in Iceland
Scandinavian Canadian
Icelandic Canadian